Lucas Daniel Till (born August 10, 1990) is an American actor. In a career spanning two decades, he has appeared in multiple film and television projects spanning a variety of genres. He is a five-time Teen Choice Award nominee.

His most notable roles include Hannah Montana: The Movie (2009), The Spy Next Door (2010), and Monster Trucks (2016). Till portrayed Havok in the X-Men prequel films from 2011 to 2016, and starred in the 2016 CBS reboot of the 1985 television series MacGyver as the titular character until its end in 2021. In 2020, he starred as Bob Zellner in the biographical drama Son of the South, to critical acclaim.

Early life and education
Lucas Daniel Till was born on August 10, 1990, in Fort Hood, Texas. He is the son of Dana Lyn (née Brady), a chemist by profession, and John Mark Till, a colonel in the Army. He has a younger brother, Nick (b. 1997). Till spent most of his childhood living in the suburbs of Atlanta, Georgia. His family quickly noticed, when he was at a very young age, that he had an affinity for impersonating voices and characters. When he was 11 years old, his mother enrolled him in local acting classes, and it was not long before he was discovered by Joy Pervis, an agent from a Talent agency in Atlanta. Till began booking almost immediately in print, local, regional, and national commercials. He later attended Kell High School. He spent three weeks in Germany as an exchange student and was also a member of the German National Honor Society. After filming for The Hannah Montana Movie in Nashville, Till went back home to graduate with the Kell High School class of 2008. After graduation, he moved to Los Angeles, California, to continue acting.

Career

2000s: Early career and Hannah Montana film 

In 2003, he made his first film collaboration in the short film The Lovesong of Edwerd J. Robble, in the role of Michael.
At the age of 12, he was cast in The Adventures of Ociee Nash in which he played Harry Vanderbilt, the bully of the main character. In 2004, Till played the role of Jay in the horror film Lightning Bug which filmed in Fairview, Alabama, and, later, he participated in the short film Pee Shy, playing Chad. His first major movie role was Jack Cash, the older brother of Johnny Cash, who died in a sawmill accident, in the biographical film Walk the Line (2005).
After Walk the Line, Till was featured in a number of television films for Lifetime and independent films. For example, the following year, Till played the young Samuel North in a feature film The Other Side filmed in Atlanta, Georgia. In 2006, he also joined the cast of the Lifetime television film Not Like Everyone Else, portraying Kyle Kenney.

In 2008, Till starred as Jensen in Gregg Bishop's horror-comedy Dance of the Dead which was hand-picked by director Sam Raimi for distribution through Lions Gate Entertainment and Ghost House Pictures. He was also invited to participate in the fifth season of the American television series House in the episode titled "Joy to the World" in the role of Simon, a high school student who has a romantic relationship with his schoolmate, but due to their social differences, they cannot be together. Three weeks before graduating from high school, Till auditioned for Hannah Montana: The Movie (starring Miley Cyrus) and landed the role of Travis Brody, a young cowboy and Miley's friend who ends up becoming her love interest. The role garnered Till two nominations at the 2009 Teen Choice Awards, in the Choice Movie Actor: Music/Dance and Choice Movie: Liplock (shared with Cyrus) categories respectively. As part of the awards promotion campaign, Till recorded three short films: Not Another Changeling Movie, a parody of Angelina Jolie's movie Changeling; The Red Menace and The Bourneson Stupidity, a parody of the film The Bourne Identity.

In early 2009, he participated in the horror film Laid to Rest as a commercial employee.
He also participated in the episodes "Scotophobia" and "Hydrophobia" of the horror web series Fear Clinic playing the character of Brett, a young man suffering from hydrophobia. He starred in the music video for Taylor Swift's "You Belong with Me" as her next-door neighbour and love interest.
Till and Swift first met in 2008 while filming for Hannah Montana: The Movie. In 2009, he participated in the fifth season of Medium in the role of Adam Mankowitz in the episode titled "Things to do in Phoenix when you're dead", and on Leo Little's Big Show along with Emily Osment in the episode titled "Hannah Montana: The Movie". He was also part of the starring cast in the movie The Lost & Found Family released directly in DVD format and distributed by Sony Pictures Home Entertainment. His character was Justin, a young boy with some bad attitudes.

2010s: Career fluctuations and breakthrough with MacGyver

In early 2010, Till played the role of a Russian agent in the film The Spy Next Door starring Jackie Chan.
That same year, he played Matt Parker, a high school quarterback in the first season of Blue Mountain State in the episode titled "The Legend of the Golden Arm".
He also returned to collaborate in the co-production in an independent science fiction adventure film directed by Jason Trost and in which he also plays Jack, a young man on vacation in Asia who realizes that his horrible dreams are becoming a reality and that reality is turning into a nightmare. The movie was called "Vacation 8".
In 2011, he was part of the cast of the Columbia Pictures-produced action science fiction film Battle: Los Angeles as Corporal Grayston. Till played Alex Summers/Havok, a mutant who has the ability to absorb solar energy which he can then launch as plasma energy from his body in the X-Men spin-off X-Men: First Class, a superhero film produced by 20th Century Fox and Marvel Entertainment directed by Matthew Vaughn. This role allowed him to receive a nomination for the 13th Teen Choice Awards in the Choice Movie: Chemistry category (shared with Jennifer Lawrence, Nicholas Hoult, Zoë Kravitz, Caleb Landry Jones, and Edi Gathegi).

In 2011, the actor took his first steps into the world of audiovisual production, collaborating with the production of the independent superhero film All Superheroes Must Die (also known as Vs)
and in which he also plays the role of Ben / Cutthroat. In the film, four superheroes (one of whom is Till) are kidnapped by their arch enemy and are forced to compete in a series of challenges to save an abandoned city full of kidnapped innocent civilians. Later that year, he collaborated on the music video accompanying the performance of Adele's song "Someone like You" by Tony Oller. In the video, Till plays Tony's friend who gets in the way of their love affair. In 2011, he also made a commercial for an international brand of sports shoes.

In 2012, Till returned to work in dramas by participating in the movie Dark Hearts in the role of Sam, a young man who travels to the city to spend time with his older brother and thus escape problems at home. He next worked with Nicole Kidman on the 2013 film Stoker, in which he played a bragging young man named Chris Pitts. He was also part of the starring cast in the direct-to-DVD film Crush as Scott Norris, a star member of the high school soccer team who despite having a knee injury caused by a blow in a game runs every morning. That same year, he returned to collaborate with Jason Trost in the production of the independent comedy Wet and Reckless and in which he played Toby 'Dollars'. He also participated with Liam Hemsworth, Gary Oldman and Harrison Ford in the film Paranoia as Kevin, friend and co-worker of Adam (Liam Hemsworth).

In 2014, he returned to movies in the horror genre by participating in the film Wolves as Cayden Richards, a high school student who is becoming a werewolf and who after the murder of his parents tries to discover the truth of who he really is. and in the thriller and drama movie Sins of our Youth as Tyler, alongside Joel Courtney, Mitchel Musso and Bridger Zardina.
He was also a co-producer on the horror and suspense film My Eleventh.
He also participated in the television series Comedy Bang! Bang! in the first episode of the third season titled "Patton Oswalt Wears a Black Blazer & Dress Shoes" and reprised his role as Havok in X-Men: Days of Future Past, the sequel to 2011's First Class.

In 2015, Till participated in the dramatic film Bravetown, originally titled Strings, playing the role of Josh Harvest a DJ in his early and formative stage, and in the suspense movie The Curse of Downers Grove in the role of Bobby.
Both movies released directly in DVD format.

In 2016, Till played Ben Philips Jr. in the horror film The Disappointments Room and returned as Havok in X-Men: Apocalypse, the third installment in the X-Men prequel films series. That same year, he began starring as Angus "Mac" MacGyver in the television reboot of MacGyver, which airs on CBS. Mac is a secret agent of a United States government organization that uses his extraordinary talent to solve problems and his extensive knowledge of science to save lives. Paramount Animation together with Nickelodeon Movies produced the comedy and adventure film titled Monster Trucks, directed by Blue Sky Studios founder Chris Wedge in which Till starred as Tripp.

During 2016 and 2017, he started working on a project as a co-producer, the science fiction and suspense film Spectrum playing the role of
a young scientist named Connor.

He also participated in the one-hour animated television special titled Michael Jackson's Halloween which premiered on CBS in October 2017 lending his voice to the character of Vincent, a young store clerk who wants to be DJ. In the same month, he participated with CBS Cares in a television campaign in support of hurricane relief in Puerto Rico after Hurricane Maria struck in the area.

CBS renewed MacGyver in which Till played the starring role, continuing his role in the second, third and fourth seasons. This leading role allowed him to receive the nomination in 2018 in the 20th edition of the Teen Choice Awards in the category of Choice TV Actor: Action, a nomination that he also received in 2019 in the 21st broadcast of the Teen Choice Awards in the same category. In addition to the leading role, Till collaborated in the production of the 13 episodes that make up the fourth season of the series.

In 2019, he collaborated again with CBS Cares in a television campaign in support of the fight against lupus.

2020s: MacGyver finale and critical success in film

He renewed his contract in 2020 to continue his leading role in the fifth season of MacGyver. Till has said in interviews that he was the subject of verbal abuse and body shaming from the showrunner of MacGyver, Peter Lenkov. Till reported being suicidal in the first year of the filming of MacGyver due to Lenkov's abuse. Lenkov was later fired from CBS on July 7, 2020.

Till played Bob Zellner, the grandson of a member of the Ku Klux Klan, who joins the civil rights movement in the United States in the film Son of the South. His role in the film, based on Zellner's autobiography The Wrong Side of Murder Creek, received critical acclaim. While the film received mixed reviews from critics, Till's performance was widely praised.

Filmography

Film

Television

Music videos

Producer

Awards and nominations

References

External links

 
 

1990 births
Living people
21st-century American male actors
American male child actors
American male film actors
American male voice actors
American male television actors
American practitioners of Brazilian jiu-jitsu
Male actors from Georgia (U.S. state)
Male actors from Texas
People from Fort Hood, Texas
People from Marietta, Georgia